Below Zero is a 1930 short film starring Laurel and Hardy, directed by James Parrott and produced by Hal Roach.

Plot
Laurel and Hardy have no success earning money on a bleak, snowy winter's day as sidewalk musicians, especially when playing "In the Good Old Summertime". This annoys a man shoveling his sidewalk and a woman who throws the pair a dollar to get them to move on. She calls out "Yoo-hoo ! Mr Whiteman", not because it's snowing, but as a joke reference to big bandleader, and violist, of the 1930s Paul Whiteman, as Oliver is plucking the similar double bass. Their instruments are destroyed in an argument with a woman, but Stan finds a wallet. They are chased by a thief, but are protected by a police officer. Stan and Ollie share a slap-up meal with the cop, but unfortunately, Stan finds out the wallet in fact belongs to the cop. When the policeman discovers this, he tells the waiter, who throws them out of the restaurant and throws Stan upside down in a barrel of water. Oliver finds Stan, who now has an enormous stomach after drinking all the water while trapped in the barrel.

Cast

Spanish version
An extended Spanish version, Tiembla Y Titubea was also produced with Laurel and Hardy speaking phonetically from blackboards placed just out of camera range; Spanish-speaking actors replacing the English speaking supporting players.

References

External links
 
 
 
 

1930 films
1930 comedy films
American black-and-white films
Films directed by James Parrott
Laurel and Hardy (film series)
Films with screenplays by H. M. Walker
1930 short films
American comedy short films
1930s American films